Dehesas Viejas is a municipality in the province of Granada, Spain. As of 2013, it had a population of 772 inhabitants.

References

External links 
 

Municipalities in the Province of Granada